Buddha in Africa is a 2019  South African Swedish documentary film produced, written and directed by Nicole Schafer. The film follows the story of Enock Alu, a Malawian orphan from a rural village growing up between the contrasting African culture and the strict discipline of the Confucian, Buddhist value of system of the Chinese. It explores the impact of the growing influence of Chinese culture in Malawi following increasing trade relations between China and Africa in the past decade.

The principal photography of the film commenced in 2012 and had a delayed release in 2019. The film had its world premiere at Hot Docs Canadian International Film Festival in April 2019. It has since screened and won awards at numerous festivals around the world.

Synopsis 
Enock is six years old when he is taken to a Confucian Buddhist orphanage and given the Chinese name Alu. He becomes extremely skilled in acrobatics. Suddenly he must make a choice to reunite with the culture of Africa or to sign up for five years in order to study in Taiwan.

Production 
After being pitched at the 2011 Durban International Film Festival, the film received the IDFA Most Promising Documentary Award. It then received international funding before being selected for the 2018 Cape Town International Film Festival Market Works-in-Progress laboratory.

Release 

The film had its world premiere at the 2019 Hot Docs Canadian International Documentary Festival. It then screened at several film festivals including Cambridge Film Festival, Encounters Festival South Africa and Sydney Film Festival.

Having won best South African documentary award at the Durban International Film Festival, the film was automatically nominated for an Academy Award.

Reception
Andrew Parker from the blog The Gate praised the cinematography of the film but criticised the screenplay for its weak content.

References

External links 

 

2019 films
South African documentary films
Films about Buddhism
Buddhism in Africa
2019 documentary films